Atizyes was a Persian satrap of Greater Phrygia under the Achaemenids in 334 BC, when Alexander the Great began his campaign. He is not mentioned in the council of Zelea where the satrap coalition was formed against the invasion, so it is not sure whether he took part in the battle of the Granicus. After the battle, he appears to be in the capital of Greater Phrygia, Celaenae where he had a garrison force of 1,000 Carians and 100 Greek mercenaries. He himself went to Syria to join the army of Darius III and fell in the battle of Issus (modern-day Turkey) at 333 BC. After Phrygia fell to Alexander, he appointed his general Antigonus Monophthalmus as its satrap.

References

Sources

External links
Original text of The Anabasis of Alexander
English version of The Anabasis of Alexander 

Satraps of the Achaemenid Empire
333 BC deaths
Opponents of Alexander the Great
4th-century BC Iranian people
Phrygia